Juan Gualberto Amaya (1887–1964) was a Mexican brigadier general and politician who served the Mexican Revolution and was notable for serving in the Third Battle of Torreón and being the former governor of Durango.

Biography
Originally from Santa María del Oro, Durango. Since 1913 he joined the forces that rose up in those surroundings against Victoriano Huerta, but his more notable military operations were carried out under the orders of General Francisco Murguía in the campaign against Pancho Villa in the north of the country, between 1917 and 1919. He joined the pronouncement of the Agua Prieta Plan against President Venustiano Carranza. Later on, he was loyal to the government of General Álvaro Obregón, reaching the rank of Brigadier General. He triumphed in the electoral fight to be Governor of Durango from 1928 to 1932, taking office on September 15, 1928. However, in March of the following year he adhered to the Hermosillo Plan, acting in agreement with the Chief of Operations in the state, General Francisco Urbalejo, to support General José Gonzalo Escobar, who had spoken in Torreón. He left the government when the Escobar Rebellion failed, in addition to the fact that the federal government ignored his military rank, taking refuge in the United States, where he remained for several years. He returned afterwards and retired to private life. He died in 1964.

References

Bibliography
 

1887 births
1964 deaths
People of the Mexican Revolution
Porfiriato
20th-century Mexican military personnel
20th-century Mexican politicians
Military personnel from Durango
Politicians from Durango
Governors of Durango